The Protestant Church in Sabah or PCS is one of the four Lutheran World Federation member churches in Malaysia. It currently has 322 congregations nationwide in 21 parishes with a total of 32,000 baptised members, making the PCS the second largest of the four Lutheran body in the country. The PCS' membership is primarily made up of the indigenous peoples of Sabah.  The current president of the Protestant Church in Sabah is Bishop Justin Sansalu.

History
The roots of the Protestant Church in Sabah goes back to German missionary work in Kudat in the beginning of the 20th century. The PCS itself was established with the first synod on 20 April 1966 and registered with the Sabah government in 1967 out of the missionary work of the Basel Mission amongst the Rungus, started in December 1952. Already in 1951, the Borneo Basel Self Established Church renamed later Basel Christian Church (BCCM) which had been established much earlier (1924) among the immigrant Chinese community in Sabah sought the help of Hans Bienz, the sixth and last BMS advisor to the BCC, to tour Rungus villages such as Kimihang, Lajong, Handal, Angkob and Rondomon in early 1952. He asked the Basel Mission to send Heinrich Honegger. In December 1952 the mission work amongst Rungus began with the assembly of 45 Rungus headmen, some BCC members and both missionaries Bienz and Honegger. In 1965, the constitution of the PCS was drafted by church elders and missionaries, and the formation of the PCS was officially initiated by a first synod on 20 April 1966 and registered as a legal entity in 1967.

Merger attempt with the Basel Christian Church
On 23 January 1968, the Basel Missionary Society started advocating a merger of both their Sabah affiliates; the BCC and PCS. A joint mission consultation was held in Kota Kinabalu on 9–13 May 1969 and was also joined by the Lutheran Church in America. However, the merger discussions did not reach an agreement due to concerns that the better organised and financially stable Basel churches may dominate the new body. Further discussions were planned but  had to be shelved when crisis hit the Christian community of Sabah as a result of a policy change by the United Sabah National Organisation (USNO) led state government to suspend the renewal of missionary visas as part of the administration's Islamisation campaign.

Consolidation
By 1973, the departure of foreign missionaries saw the BCC playing a more direct role in providing support for the PCS. Training of local workers was prioritised while contacts were developed between the PCS and other churches in Malaysia . In 1975, the PCS became a member of the World Council of Churches.

Expansion beyond Sabah
In 1996, congregations were established in West Malaysia and Singapore to minister to the growing migrant worker population in those territories from Sabah.

Leadership

Since the PCS was organised in 1965, the head of the Executive Council is known as the President. The current president, Bishop Justin Sansalu is the ninth of the PCS.
 1964-1967
Rev. T.A. Forschner
 1967-1970
Rev. Otto Dilger
 1970-1976
Patrick Manjil Madalag
 1976-1992
Rev. Masandu Majupi
 1992-2000
Rev. Hendry Ogodong Dangki
 2000-2008
Rev. Sopirid Masandu
 2008– 2012
Rev. Jimmy Ojlim Assam
 2012–2020
Rev. Jensey Mojuin
 2020–present
Bishop Justin Sansalu

Schools and colleges

Theological training
In 1956, a Bible school was established in Tinangol near Kudat and continued to operate until 1973 when the USNO led Islamization campaign in the state of Sabah was at its height. The institution was re-opened in 1976 after the fall of the USNO-led administration as the Tinangol Bible Training Centre.

Vocational training
An agricultural school was established in Sikuati. The school was relocated to Timangol in 1965 and is currently known as the Women's Development Centre.

Academic
In 1964, the Basel Mission established three primary schools known as Native Voluntary Schools in the vicinity of Kudat. These were handed over to the PCS when the mission withdrew from Sabah and are currently operating as grant-in-aid schools:
 SRK Tinangol
 SRK Lodung
 SRK Lajung

Affiliations
The PCS participates in ecumenical relationships through:
 Council of Churches of Malaysia
 Christian Federation of Malaysia
 Christian Conference of Asia
 World Council of Churches
 Federation of Evangelical Lutheran Churches in Malaysia & Singapore
 Basel Christian Church of Malaysia
 Lutheran Church in Malaysia
 Evangelical Lutheran Church in Malaysia
 Lutheran Church in Singapore
 Lutheran World Federation
 Asia Lutheran Communion

References

External links
 
 Protestant Church in Sabah

Protestantism in Malaysia
Malaysia
Malaysia
Malaysia
Christian organizations established in 1963